Belle Rock Entertainment is a global gaming and entertainment group, licensed in Gibraltar, operating seven online casinos, online poker rooms and an online sportsbook. Owned by Chairman Tim Johnson, the Carmen Group was formed in 2002 out of the Demmy Group of companies. Prior to 2004 the company was known as  Carmen Media Group Limited.

All casinos and poker rooms use software created and powered by Microgaming Systems. They have all been approved by eCOGRA, an online gaming industry group. Transactions on these sites are secured by 128-bit SSL or Secure Sockets Layer encryption, verified by the VeriSign Certificate. Independent Auditors review payout percentages of the online casinos and the results are published monthly.

Belle Rock Entertainment is the umbrella brand for a group of online casinos and poker rooms. It was created in 2004 and is Belle Rock's main brands are River Belle, The Gaming Club, Jackpot City, King Neptunes Casino and Lucky Nugget.

The company's casinos are typically divided between Table Games, Slots, Video Poker and other games. Some of its casinos ended in the top ten list of Best Casino Source including Jackpot City Casino.

References
 Pusulabet Giriş

External links
Belle Rock Entertainment

Online gambling companies of Gibraltar
Online poker companies
Mass media companies established in 2002
2002 establishments in Gibraltar